Wallenberg is a Swedish surname which may refer to:

People
 Adolf Wallenberg (1862–1949), German internist and neurologist
 André  Oscar Wallenberg (1816–1886), Swedish banker, industrialist, newspaper tycoon, father of Knuth Agathon, Marcus Sr., Victor
 Gustaf Wally (born Wallenberg, 1905–1966), Swedish dancer, actor and theatre manager
 Jacob Wallenberg (1892–1980) Swedish banker and industrialist, son of Marcus Sr.
 Jacob Wallenberg (born 1956), Swedish banker and industrialist, son of Peter Sr.
 Knut Agathon Wallenberg (1853–1938), Swedish banker and politician, half-brother of Marcus Sr.
 Marc Wallenberg (1924–1971), Swedish banker and industrialist, son of Marcus Jr.
 Marcus Wallenberg (bishop) (1774–1833), Swedish theologian and bishop, father of André Oscar
 Marcus Wallenberg Sr. (1864–1943), Swedish banker and industrialist, father of Jacob and Marcus Jr.
 Marcus Wallenberg Jr. (1899–1982), Swedish banker and industrialist, son of Marcus Sr., father of Peter Sr.
 Marcus Wallenberg (born 1956), Swedish banker and industrialist, son of Marc
 Peter Wallenberg Sr. (1926–2015), Swedish industrialist, son of Marcus Jr.
 Peter Wallenberg Jr. (born 1959), Swedish businessman, son of Peter Sr.
 Raoul Wallenberg (1912–1947?), Swedish diplomat acclaimed for his role in saving a great number of Jews in the Holocaust
 Victor Wallenberg (1875–1970), Swedish sports shooter, brother of Marcus Sr.
Wallenberg family, prominent Swedish family, renowned as bankers, industrialists, politicians, diplomats and philanthropists

Other
 Wallenberg Medal, University of Michigan award and endowment
 Wallenberg expressway, Highway in Rockford, Illinois, named after Raoul
 Raoul Wallenberg Traditional High School, in San Francisco, California
 Knut and Alice Wallenberg Foundation, Swedish private foundation
 Wallenberg's Syndrome, also known as Lateral medullary syndrome
 Raoul-Wallenberg-Straße station, railway station in the Marzahn-Hellersdorf district of Berlin
 Raoul Wallenberg Committee of the United States, organization based in the United States 
 Raoul Wallenberg Award, bestowed by the Raoul Wallenberg Committee of the United States 
 Marcus Wallenberg-hallen, vehicle museum in Södertälje, in the Swedish province of Sörmland
 Wallenberg Set, popular spot for skateboarders at the Raoul Wallenberg Traditional High School
 Wallenberg (opera), 2001 opera by Erkki-Sven Tüür about events in Raoul Wallenberg's life

Swedish-language surnames